"Still Holding On" is a song recorded by American country music artists Clint Black and Martina McBride, written by Black along with Matraca Berg and Marty Stuart.  It was released in June 1997 as the first single from Black's album Nothin' but the Taillights and McBride's album Evolution.

History
Black told Billboard that Joe Galante, then the chairman of RCA Records, suggested that he record a duet, because he thought that it would be a good time in Black's career for him to release one. Because of her busy schedule, McBride cut the duet vocals with Black in one day.

The song received a nomination for the Grammy Award for Best Country Collaboration with Vocals at the 40th Annual Grammy Awards in 1998.

Still Holding On is also a television film which aired in 1998 based on the rodeo career of Jack Favor, who served seven years in the Louisiana State Penitentiary on false conviction of two murders based on perjured testimony He was acquitted in a second trial in 1974. Black plays Favor in the film, and Lisa Hartman Black is cast as Ponder Favor, Jack's wife.

Critical reception
Deborah Evans Price, of Billboard magazine reviewed the song favorably, saying that Black's and McBride's voices "blend beautifully, and when they soar into the chorus, it's goosebumps time." She goes on to call the song "the clearest possible definition of a hit."

Chart performance
On the Hot Country Singles & Tracks charts in the United States, "Still Holding On" debuted on the chart dated for the week ending June 14, 1997. It spent 20 weeks on that chart, peaking at number 11.

In Canada, the song debuted at number 83 on the RPM Country Tracks charts on the week of June 16 and peaked at number 1 on the week of August 18. In addition, it peaked at number 50 on the same publication's Adult Contemporary chart.

Year-end charts

References

1997 singles
Clint Black songs
Martina McBride songs
Male–female vocal duets
Songs written by Clint Black
Songs written by Matraca Berg
Songs written by Marty Stuart
Song recordings produced by Clint Black
Song recordings produced by James Stroud
RCA Records Nashville singles
1997 songs